Ronald Kissell (9 August 1928 – 30 June 2015) was an Australian cricketer. He played eleven first-class matches for New South Wales between 1946 and 1952.

See also
 List of New South Wales representative cricketers

References

External links
 

1928 births
2015 deaths
Australian cricketers
New South Wales cricketers
Cricketers from Sydney